Kilrea is a village, townland and civil parish in County Londonderry, Northern Ireland. It gets its name from the ancient church that was located near to where the current Church of Ireland is located on Church Street looking over the town. It is near the River Bann, which marks the boundary between County Londonderry and County Antrim. In the 2011 Census it had a population of 1,678 people. It is situated within Causeway Coast and Glens district.

History 
There is a tradition that St Patrick visited the area during the fifth century, a story repeated recently in the book 'The Fairy Thorn' produced by Kilrea local historians. During the Plantation of Ulster Kilrea and the surrounding townlands were granted to the Worshipful Company of Mercers by King James I for settlement. Their headquarters in Ulster were at nearby Movanagher on the banks of the River Bann. Today Kilrea is a market town and commercial centre of the surrounding district. The village is centred on 'The Diamond' which includes the town's War Memorial erected in honour of Kilrea men killed in the Great War. The village is featured in the Orange song, Sprigs of Kilrea. It is also mentioned in the song Kitty the rose of Kilrea by The Irish Rover band.

The Troubles 
A total of seven people died in violence relating to the Troubles. Five were killed by the Provisional Irish Republican Army (IRA) and two by the Ulster Freedom Fighters (UFF). All the IRA's victims were current or former members of the security forces, with two belonging to the Royal Ulster Constabulary, one a current and one a former member of the Ulster Defence Regiment, and one belonging to the British Territorial Army. All were Protestants and three of the five were off duty when they were killed. According to the Sutton Index of Deaths, both men killed by the UFF were former members of the IRA. At the time of their deaths both were associated with Sinn Féin. Both were Catholic. Of the seven killed in the Kilrea Troubles, all were killed in separate incidents and all were shot except one of the RUC officers, who was killed by a booby trap bomb while on patrol. While deaths in many other areas were concentrated in the early 1970s, in Kilrea they were spread between 1976 and 1992.

Festival of the Fairy Thorn 
A feature of Kilrea is its 'Fairy Thorn' tree, which stands just outside the front wall of First Kilrea Presbyterian Church. The festival began in 1992 and ran for 11 years until 2003, but was again revived successfully in 2022 as a summer cross-community festival in the town.  The festival features, among other events, Comedy and Music nights, Funfairs and fun days for children, Vintage Rallies, Treasure Hunts and showcases for the townsfolk by the townsfolk.

Notable people 
 Martin O'Neill, ex professional footballer and ex-manager of Celtic FC
 John Dallat, first nationalist mayor of the Borough of Coleraine
 Monica McWilliams, academic and former politician

Railways
Kilrea railway station was opened by the Derry Central Railway on 18 February 1880. It was taken over by the Northern Counties Committee in September 1901.

The station closed to passengers on 28 August 1950 by the Ulster Transport Authority.

Sport 

 Kilrea Angling Club
 Kilrea Camogie Club
 Kilrea Golf Club
 Kilrea Pádraig Pearses GAC
 Kilrea United Football Club
 Manor Golf and Sports Club
 Go Pro Kart Racing Movanagher Road
 Kilrea Sports Complex

Education 
 Kilrea Primary School
 St Columba's Primary School
 St Paul's College
 Crossroads Primary School

Religion 

 Boveedy Presbyterian Church
 First Kilrea Presbyterian Church
 Kilrea Baptist Church
 Second Kilrea Presbyterian Church
 St Anne's Oratory
 St Patrick's Church of Ireland
 St. Mary's Roman Catholic Church (Drumnagarner)

2011 Census 
Kilrea is classified as a village by the Northern Ireland Statistics and Research Agency (NISRA) (i.e., with population between 1,000 and 2,499 people). On Census day (22 March 2011) there were 1,678 people living in Kilrea. Of these:
 21.81% were aged under 16 years and 14.12% were aged 65 and over
 49.05% of the population were male and 50.95% were female
 73.42% were from a Catholic background and 23.48% were from a Protestant background
 7.59% of people aged 16–74 were unemployed

See also
List of civil parishes of County Londonderry

References

External links 

Villages in County Londonderry
Civil parishes of County Londonderry
Causeway Coast and Glens district